Anatoli Tonov (born 19 September 1968) is a former Bulgarian footballer who last managed of Bulgarian side Levski Lom.

Career
A native of Sofia, Tonov played for professional teams in the A PFG and B PFG as well as in the V AFG. He also had spells in South Korea and China. Between 1996 and 1998, Tonov was part of the Levski Sofia squad, reaching a Bulgarian Cup final in 1997. In November 2021, Tonov was promoted to head coach of Levski Lom after Ivaylo Vasilev was released from his duties. He remained in that position until mid March 2022 when the management decided to discontinue the team's participation in professional football.

References

1968 births
Living people
Association football forwards
Bulgarian footballers
Footballers from Sofia
FC Montana players
PFC Levski Sofia players
FC Septemvri Sofia players
FC Hebar Pazardzhik players
PFC Belasitsa Petrich players
PFC Spartak Varna players
Botev Plovdiv players
PFC Vidima-Rakovski Sevlievo players
PFC Rodopa Smolyan players
First Professional Football League (Bulgaria) players
Expatriate footballers in China
Expatriate footballers in South Korea
Bulgarian expatriate footballers